Liu Lin (born 10 January 1977) is a Chinese rower. She competed in two events at the 2000 Summer Olympics.

References

External links
 

1977 births
Living people
Chinese female rowers
Olympic rowers of China
Rowers at the 2000 Summer Olympics
Place of birth missing (living people)